Stephen Hunt is a writer best known for a series of fantasy novels with steampunk elements known as the Jackelian series, whose central setting is a nation somewhat resembling Victorian England named the Kingdom of Jackals. Influences on his work include: Jack Williamson, Stephen Goldin, David Gemmell, Bruce Sterling, Larry Niven and Michael Moorcock.

Publishing history
Hunt's short fiction has appeared in various mainly US and UK-based genre magazines, and some of his earliest works were written in the cyberpunk subgenre of science fiction. The best-known of these was the "Hollow Duellists," a short story which William Gibson was reported to admire as one of the leading works of the second-wave of cyberpunk fiction, and which later went on to win the 1992 ProtoStellar magazine prize for best short fiction story, a tie with British SF author Stephen Baxter.

Stephen Hunt became the first client of the then-newly established John Jarrold Literary Agency in 2005. Hunt's second novel, The Court of the Air, was the subject of an auction held by John Jarrold in late 2005 between the UK's main publishing houses. HarperCollins outbid their competitors to sign Hunt for a three-book deal, later extended to a six-book contract. The Bookseller magazine reported HarperCollins won the auction with a high six-figure sum.

Foreign-language and international editions of the novels of the Jackelian series have been sold to Tor Books (USA), Albin Michel (France), Verlagsgruppe Random House (Germany), Enterbrain Manga and Anime (Japan), Edições Saída de Emergência (Portugal and Brazil), Paidós (Spain), AST (Russia), and the Anhui Literature and Art Publishing House (China).

Works
His first fantasy novel, For the Crown and the Dragon, was published in 1994, and introduced a young officer, Taliesin, fighting for the Queen of the United Kingdom in a Napoleonic-period alternative reality, where the wars of Europe were being fought with sorcery and steampunk weapons (airships, clockwork machine guns, and steam-driven trucks called kettle-blacks). The book reviewer Andrew Darlington used Hunt's novel to coin the phrase "Flintlock Fantasy" to describe the subgenre of fantasy set in a Regency or Napoleonic-era period.

Sliding Void series 

The Sliding Void sequence is a space opera series from Stephen Hunt published under the Green Nebula imprint. It follows the misadventures of the crew of a commercial tramp freighter called the Gravity Rose, captained by a female Han Solo-like commander, Lana Fiveworlds. The first novel, Void all the Way Down was originally published as three serialised novellas, Sliding Void, Transference Station, and Red Sun Bleeding, before being combined into the novel. A second full-length novel which was not serialised followed called Anomalous Thrust.

Sliding Void's main polity is the Triple Alliance (often simply the 'Alliance' or 'TA'), a bureaucratic multi-world confederation of the three dominant species, of which humanity is one. Most of the books' events occur in The Edge, a lawless independent region of free worlds bordering the Alliance. While guest of honour at Toronto's Ad Astra convention, Hunt described how he had written the series as a homage to fill the void left by the cancellation of all of his favourite TV science fiction series: Star Trek, Stargate, Firefly, Battlestar Galactica and Farscape (the void of the series title being both an allusion to this, as well as 'Sliding Void' being used by spacers as slang for sub-warp transit).

The first novel, Void all the Way Down, focuses on the inclusion of Calder, an exiled prince from a medieval-level failed colony world, into the ship's crew as they embark on running supplies to an illegal mining operation.

The second novel, Anomalous Thrust, finds the crew stranded on a world boycotted by civilisation for its human colonists' enslavement of the local sentient species. Here, they find they can only escape by taking part in a solar sail race to recover valuable alien garbage jettisoned by a moon-sized vessel making a periodic tour of multiple galaxies - a trope inspired by Rendezvous with Rama.

Far-called series 

The Far-called sequence is a fantasy series from Stephen Hunt set on the world of Pellas. The first book in the series, In Dark Service was published by Gollancz, the science fiction and fantasy imprint of Hachette and Orion Publishing, on 15 May 2014. The second novel in the series, Foul Tide's Turning, was released on 21 May 2015. The third novel in the series, The Stealers' War, was released on 16 March 2016.

Hunt mentioned at Comic-Con that his books set in Pellas draw on the events of the U.S. Civil War, just as Game of Thrones draw on the feuding of 15th-century England's Wars of the Roses (an idea that came to Hunt after meeting George RR Martin at a party hosted by HarperCollins in the Tower of London during April 2012).

The plot of In Dark Service concerns two central families, the Carnehans and Landors, whose children are kidnapped by slavers from the town of Northhaven in the Kingdom of Weyland. The town launches a rescue expedition to free the taken from captivity, but with little chances of success given the vast scale of the world of Pellas. The first novel focuses on both the adventures of the pursuing towns-people and the slaves' struggle to survive their harsh captivity. While little is revealed of the geophysics enabling a planet the size of Pellas to sustain habitable levels of gravity (aside from occasional references to anti-gravity stones), the geopolitical impacts of such a vast land, where inequitable access to resources causes incredible polarisation of technological progress, are explored through the narrative and the descriptions of a wide range of cultures.

The second book in the series builds tension as the actions of the Carnehan protagonists bring the distant and ruthlessly amoral Vandian Empire into conflict with the far less technologically advanced and economically enriched kingdoms which have ostensibly thrived in a different part of the world.  It also begins to reveal undercurrents of a deeper spiritual battle between good and evil.

The third book in the series, The Stealers' War, moves towards the trilogy's end-game as the various forces of Vandia and the two sides of Weyland's civil war plays out in a final battle.

Jackelian series 
The Court of the Air (published 2007), is a fantasy steampunk novel set in a Victorian-esque world with the addition of magic in various forms and where steam power, rather than oil, drives the economy.

The nation in which the plot is largely set (the Kingdom of Jackals) is recognisably based on Victorian Britain and the main neighbouring country (Quatérshift) is presumably inspired by the Paris Commune and various other communist states . A follow-up of sorts, The Kingdom Beyond the Waves (published 2008), is set in the same world and introduces more races and tells some of the back-story.

The Court of the Air commenced Hunt's Jackelian fantasy series, and was the first of his works to be published by HarperCollins. The Court of the Air was one of the ten books selected by the organisers of the Berlinale Film Festival/Co-Production Market for presentation to US and European film producers. HarperCollins's elevator pitch for The Court of the Air was summarised as Charles Dickens meets Blade Runner.

In November 2008, his second book in the Jackelian series, The Kingdom Beyond the Waves, was nominated for the long-list of the David Gemmell Legend Award for Fantasy. The second novel continues the misadventures of u-boat privateer Commodore Jared Black, as the commodore goes in search of the ruins of a lost ancient utopia.

The third book in the series, The Rise of the Iron Moon, published in the UK in February 2009, features the invasion of the Kingdom of Jackals from the north by a horde called the Army of Shadows. It features the reappearance of the main protagonists from The Court of the Air, including Molly Templar, Oliver Brooks, the steamman scientist Coppertracks and Commodore Jared Black. The main new character is Purity Drake, a royalist prisoner of the state.

The fourth book, Secrets of the Fire Sea, is a murder mystery set on the island of Jago (in the Fire Sea of the title), and features the consulting detective Jethro Daunt and his steamman assistant Boxiron attempting to uncover the murderer of the island's arch-bishop. Commodore Black ferries the investigators from the kingdom to Jago, and acts as a reluctant foil for the pair's sleuthing. The novel was published in the UK as a hardback in 2010 and as a paperback in 2011.

The fifth novel in the series, Jack Cloudie, centres around an airship war between the Kingdom of Jackals and the Empire of Cassarabia in the south. The main characters are Jack Keats, a young thief pressed into service with the Jackelian airship fleet, and Jared Black. The commodore is being blackmailed into helping the high fleet by the Kingdom's secret police, the State Protection Board.

The title of the sixth book, published in February 2012, is From the Deep of the Dark. While appearing as guest of honour at the 2010 Forum Fantastico, Portugal's national science fiction convention, Hunt described his sixth book as primarily a spy mystery. It features Dick Tull, an officer of the State Protection Board close to retirement, the consulting detectives Jethro Daunt and Boxiron, and Commodore Jared Black. The characters are investigating the theft of the Jackelian royal sceptre and a series of strange murders and bloodless corpses in the capital, Middlesteel.  Thief Charlotte Shades is asked by two mysterious men to steal King Jude's Sceptre from the Parliament vaults.  Daunt and Boxiron know there is more to the two men than meets the eye and, with the rescued thief, escape in an ancient submarine captained by Commodore Jethro Black.  They encounter resistance from strange underwater races, but human, steam-man, seanore and gillneck must band together to save the kingdom from danger.

While speaking at the Forum Fantastico, Hunt noted the versatility of fantasy as a genre, and described his Jackelian series as quest novel (The Court of the Air), adventure novel (The Kingdom Beyond the Waves), invasion tale (The Rise of the Iron Moon), murder mystery (Secrets of the Fire Sea), war story (Jack Cloudie) and spy novel (From the Deep of the Dark ).

Bibliography
 For the Crown and the Dragon (October 1994)

The Agatha Witchley Mysteries series
 Secrets of the Moon (May 2015)

The Songs of Old Sol series

Empty Between The Stars (June 2018)

Jackelian series

The Court of the Air (April 2007)
 Published in the US in June 2008, 
The Kingdom Beyond the Waves (May 2008)
 Published in the US July 2009, 
The Rise of the Iron Moon (Feb 2009)
 Published in the US March 2011, 978-0765327666
Secrets of the Fire Sea (Feb 2010)
Jack Cloudie (July 2011)
From The Deep of the Dark (Feb 2012)
Mission to Mightadore (May 2015)

Far-called series
 In Dark Service (May 2014)
 Foul Tide's Turning (May 2015)
 The Stealers' War (March 2016)

Sliding Void
 Void all the Way Down (September 2014)
 Anomalous Thrust (May 2016)
 Hell Fleet (December 2018)

Reviews

References

External links
Stephen Hunt's official blog
Stephen Hunt's magazine site
Stephen Hunt's school literacy progam

1966 births
Living people
British fantasy writers
British alternative history writers
British historical novelists
20th-century British novelists
21st-century British novelists
British male novelists